Minolops rosulenta is a species of sea snail, a marine gastropod mollusk in the family Solariellidae.

Distribution
This marine species is endemic to Australia and occurs on the continental shelf off New South Wales.

References

 Watson, R.B. 1886. Report on the Scaphopoda and Gastropoda collected by the H.M.S. "Challenger" during the years 1873-1876. , Zoology 15(42): 756 pp., 50 pls
  Hedley, C. 1903. Scientific results of the trawling expedition of H.M.C.S. "Thetis" off the coast of New South Wales in February and March, 1898, pt. 6. Memoirs of the Australian Museum 4(1): 326-402
 Iredale, T. 1929. Mollusca from the continental shelf of eastern Australia. No. 2. Records of the Australian Museum 17(4): 157-189, pls 38-41
 Iredale, T. & McMichael, D.F. 1962. A reference list of the marine Mollusca of New South Wales. Memoirs of the Australian Museum 11: 1-109

External links
 To World Register of Marine Species

rosulenta
Gastropods described in 1883